Jason Rouser (born March 22, 1970, in Tucson, Arizona) is a retired American sprinter who specialized in the 400 metres.

At the 1993 World Indoor Championships he finished sixth in the 400 metres and won a gold medal in 4x400 metres relay. He won another relay gold medal at the 1997 World Indoor Championships.

At the 1996 Olympic Games he ran the 2nd leg for the American relay team that won a gold medal.

References

 

1970 births
Living people
American male sprinters
Athletes (track and field) at the 1996 Summer Olympics
Olympic gold medalists for the United States in track and field
Place of birth missing (living people)
Medalists at the 1996 Summer Olympics
Goodwill Games medalists in athletics
Track and field athletes from Oklahoma
World Athletics Indoor Championships winners
Competitors at the 1994 Goodwill Games